Quercus kelloggii, the California black oak, also known as Kellogg oak, is an oak in the red oak section (genus Quercus, section Lobatae, series Agrifoliae) native to western North America. Although genetically separated from them for more than 20 million years, its leaves (though not its fruit) are remarkably similar in appearance to several other members of the red oak section including the red oak (Quercus rubra) and the black oak (Quercus velutina) found in eastern and central North America.

Description

The species also grows in shrubby scrub-oak form on poor sites. In open areas, the crown is broad and rounded, with lower branches nearly touching the ground or forming a browse line. In closed stands, the crown is narrow and slender in young trees and irregularly broad in old trees. Trunks are usually free of branches on the lower  in closed stands. Trunks are often forked, and usually decayed and hollow in older trees. The bark is thin and smooth in young trees, becoming thick, ridged, plate-like, and blackish with age. This oak grows from one to several vertical roots which penetrate to bedrock, with large, laterally spreading roots extending off from vertical ones. It also has a number of surface roots.

While individual trees generally have a lifespan between 100 and 200 years, California black oak can live up to 500 years.

The tree reproduces when its acorns sprout to form seedlings. It also reproduces vegetatively with new growth sprouting from the root crown after the tree is top-killed by wildfire, logging, frost, or other events.

Distribution and habitat
California black oak is a deciduous tree growing in mixed evergreen forests, oak woodlands, and coniferous forests. California black oak is distributed along foothills and lower mountains of California and western Oregon.

It is found from Lane County, Oregon, south through the Cascade Range, the Sierra Nevada, and the Coast, Transverse, and Peninsular Ranges to San Diego County, California. The tree occurs in pure or mixed stands. Pure stands usually indicate sites unfavorable to conifer growth or recurring disturbance such as fire or logging activities. The tree can grow in many types of soils, but they must be well-drained.

Ecology
The California black oak is a critical species for wildlife. Oaks (Quercus spp.) may be the single most important genus used by wildlife for food and cover in California forests and rangelands, and California black oak occupies more total area in California than any other hardwood species. Livestock also make heavy use of this species for food and cover.

Older trees affected by heart rot have cavities which provide den or nest sites for owls, various woodpeckers, tree squirrels, and American black bears. Trees provide valuable shade for livestock and wildlife during the hot summer. California black oak forest types are heavily used for spring, summer, and fall cover by black bears.

It is browsed by deer and livestock. Acorns are heavily used by livestock, mule deer, feral pigs, rodents, mountain quail, Steller's jays, and woodpeckers. Acorns constitute an average of 50% of the fall and winter diets of western gray squirrels and black-tailed deer during good mast years. Fawn survival rates increase or decrease with the size of the acorn crop.

It is a preferred foraging substrate for many birds. All of 68 bird species observed in oak woodlands of the Tehachapi Mountains of California used California black oak for part of their foraging activities. Acorn woodpecker, Bullock's oriole, and Nashville warbler show strong preferences for California black oak. The parasitic plant Pacific mistletoe (Phoradendron villosum), which commonly grows on this oak, produces berries that attract birds, as well.

Many animals cache the acorns, and acorns that have been stored in the ground or otherwise buried are more likely to sprout than those that remain on the surface.

The tree is adapted to wildfire. It is protected from smaller fires by its thick bark. If it is top-killed and burned away in a larger fire, it easily resprouts and has a good supply of nutrients and water stored in its root system. Acorns sprout into seedlings after fire, and sites that have been cleared of canopy and leaf litter in fires are ideal for seedling success.

The tree is less shade tolerant than its associate ponderosa pine. It is vulnerable to sudden oak death.

Allergenicity
The pollen is released in spring and is a severe allergen.

Uses
Some California Native Americans prefer California black oak acorns over those of other species for making acorn meal. Historically, this acorn was a staple food for many Native American groups, who usually leached out the bitter tannin. Native Americans recognized the importance of fire to this oak, and purposely lit fires in oak woodlands to promote its health and ensure their food source.

The wood is used for making furniture, pallets, and construction timber. The tree is used as an ornamental.

Timber
California black oak comprises a total volume of 29% of California's hardwood timber resources, and is the major hardwood sawn into lumber there. The total estimated area of species occurrence is 361,800 hectares (3,618 square kilometers or 894,000 acres); 239,200 ha (2,392 km² or 591,000 acres) of timberland and 122,600 ha (1,226 km² or 303,000 acres) of woodland. Of this land 60% is privately owned, 31% is in National Forests, and 9% is on other public lands. It has greatly decreased from its historic abundance. This is due to a number of factors, including drought, disease, animal foraging, logging practices, fire suppression, and a variety of other human impacts. Cutting green trees for fuelwood has contributed to the decline of this species, and illegal harvesting of green trees from public lands is a continuing problem.

It was long considered by foresters and government agencies to be a weed tree. In its earlier years, its only use to settlers was to feed the boilers of donkey engines bringing in the valuable pine and fir logs. For a period in the mid-1960s, the U.S. Forest Service policy in California's National Forests was systematic extermination of California black oak by girdling the trees. The objective was to make room for more coniferous growth. In the rush to use the pines, firs, and redwoods, the dense hardwoods were looked on with contempt. Like a few other visionaries in the 1960s, Guy Hall thought the California black oak presented a beautiful challenge that deserved better than eradication. In 1965, Hall convinced federal agencies to cease their extermination policies.

Plantations of California black oak have been successfully established in clearcuts from acorn plantings. This tree has also been managed for hardwood production by maintaining scattered pure stands within coniferous forests. Stands of this species often establish on poorer sites, where conifer seedling establishment has not been successful.

Cultivation
Q. kelloggii is cultivated in the specialty horticulture trade as an ornamental tree for native plant, drought-tolerant, water-conserving, and habitat gardens, and various types of municipal, commercial, and agency sustainable landscape and restoration projects.

See also
 Black oak (disambiguation)
 Mediterranean California lower montane black oak–conifer forest – plant association
 California chaparral and woodlands – ecoregion
 California montane chaparral and woodlands – subecoregion
 California interior chaparral and woodlands – subecoregion

References

Further reading
 Hall, G. (1998). The management, manufacture, marketing of California black oak, Pacific madrone and tanoak: A practical handbook on successful hardwood utilization in California and southern Oregon. Western Hardwood Association.

External links

 
 Nupa (Black Oak Acorn) Soup recipe — from Tuolumne Rancheria.
 
 Interactive Map of Quercus kelloggii Range
 Beckman, E. 2016. Quercus kelloggii. The IUCN Red List of Threatened Species 2016. Downloaded on 19 July 2017.

kelloggii
Flora of the West Coast of the United States
Natural history of the California chaparral and woodlands
Natural history of the California Coast Ranges
Natural history of the Peninsular Ranges
Plants described in 1859
Natural history of the San Francisco Bay Area
Natural history of the Santa Monica Mountains
Natural history of the Transverse Ranges
Trees of Mediterranean climate
Garden plants of North America
Ornamental trees
Drought-tolerant trees